Katu, or Low Katu, is a Katuic language of eastern Laos and central Vietnam.

In Vietnam, it is spoken in Thừa Thiên–Huế Province, including in A Lưới commune. According to the 2009 Vietnamese census, there are 61,588 Katu people.

Phonology

Consonants 

  can also be heard as a preglottal affricate sound  or glide .
  can range to an alveolar fricative .

Vowels 

References

Further reading
 Nguyễn Hữu Hoành & Nguyễn Văn Lợi. 1998. Tiếng Katu. Hà Nội: Nhà Xuất Bản Khoa Học Xã Hội.
 Sidwell, Paul. (2005). The Katuic languages: classification, reconstruction and comparative lexicon. LINCOM studies in Asian linguistics, 58. Muenchen: Lincom Europa. 
Theraphan L-Thongkum. 2001. Languages of the Tribes in Xekong Province Southern Laos. The Thailand Research Fund. Bangkok, Chulalongkorn University.

Languages of Laos
Languages of Vietnam
Katuic languages